505 Züm Bovaird is an express bus route in Brampton, Ontario. This route began service on September 2, 2014. The headways are 15 minutes during peak periods and 20 minutes off peak. This route does not operate during early mornings on Sundays and late evenings on all days. This route duplicates service with 5 Bovaird and 5A Bovaird (between Mount Pleasant GO and Airport Road) before turning south and duplicating with the 30 Airport Road, and 5A Bovaird.

After terminating at the Airport Loop (Queen Street & Goreway Drive) during the route's initial run, a southern extension along Airport Road was added on September 4, 2018. The route now terminates at Malton GO, just south of Derry Road in Mississauga. Also on the same day, the route no longer interlined with Route 561 Züm Queen West.

Stops

References

Züm bus routes
2014 establishments in Ontario